The Visakhapatnam–Kirandul Passenger is a Passenger train belonging to Indian Railways that runs between  and  as a daily service. It is maintained by the East Coast Railway zone.

Coaches
This train consists of one Sleeper Class, one AC 2 Tier Class, one chair car, six General Unreserved and two guard cum luggage vans. Total composition is 11 coaches.

Service

Traction
It is hauled by WAG-7 electric loco from Visakhapatnam to Kirandul.

References

Slow and fast passenger trains in India
Railway services introduced in 1968
Rail transport in Andhra Pradesh
Rail transport in Odisha
Rail transport in Chhattisgarh
Transport in Visakhapatnam